David Hackett Fischer (born December 2, 1935) is University Professor of History Emeritus at Brandeis University. Fischer's major works have covered topics ranging from large macroeconomic and cultural trends (Albion's Seed, The Great Wave) to narrative histories of significant events (Paul Revere's Ride, Washington's Crossing) to explorations of historiography (Historians' Fallacies, in which he coined the term "historian's fallacy").

Education
Fischer grew up in Baltimore, Maryland. He received an A.B. from Princeton University in 1958 and a Ph.D. from Johns Hopkins University in 1962.

Career
Fischer has been on the faculty of Brandeis University for 50 years, where he is known for being interested in his students and history.

He is best known for two major works: Albion's Seed (1989), and Washington's Crossing (Pivotal Moments in American History) (2004).  In Albion's Seed, he argues that core aspects of American culture stem from four British folkways and regional cultures and that their interaction and conflict have been decisive factors in U.S. political and historical development.  In Washington's Crossing, Fischer provides a narrative of George Washington's leadership of the Continental Army during the winter of 1776–1777 during the American Revolutionary War.

He was admitted as an honorary member of The Society of the Cincinnati in 2006. He is a member of the board of College of the Atlantic in Bar Harbor, Maine.

Awards
Washington's Crossing (Pivotal Moments in American History) (2004) won the 2005 Pulitzer Prize for History and was a 2004 finalist for the National Book Award in the Nonfiction category.

He received the 2006 Irving Kristol Award from the American Enterprise Institute.

In 2008, he published Champlain's Dream, an exploration of Samuel de Champlain, the French explorer and founder of Quebec City. The book was a runner-up in the 2009 Cundill Prize.

In 2015, Fischer was named the recipient of the Pritzker Literature Award for Lifetime Achievement in Military Writing.

In addition to these literary awards, he has been recognized for his commitment to teaching with the 1990 Carnegie Prize as Massachusetts Professor of the Year and the Louis Dembitz Brandeis Prize for Excellence in Teaching.

Selected works

Historians' Fallacies: Toward a Logic of Historical Thought (1970) 
The Revolution of American Conservatism: The Federalist Party in the Era of Jeffersonian Democracy (1976) 
Growing Old in America (1977) Series: Chester Bland—Dwight E. Lee Lectures in History.
Concord: The Social History of a New England Town 1750–1850 (1984) (Editor)
Albion's Seed: Four British Folkways in America (1989) 
Paul Revere's Ride (1994), Oxford University Press, 
The Great Wave: Price Revolutions and the Rhythm of History (1996) 
Bound Away: Virginia and the Westward Movement (2000), with James C. Kelly, University of Virginia Press, 
Washington's Crossing (Pivotal Moments in American History) (2004) 
Liberty and Freedom: A Visual History of America's Founding Ideas (2005) 
Champlain's Dream: The European Founding of North America (2008) 
Fairness and Freedom: A History of Two Open Societies: New Zealand and the United States (2012) 
 African Founders: How Enslaved People Expanded American Ideals (2022)

References

External links
Image and article about David Fischer and his awards.
A review of David Hackett Fischer's Historians' Fallacies : Toward a Logic of Historical Thought
Brandeis University History Department Faculty Page
David Hackett Fischer, biographical sketch at Brandeis Magazine
They Didn't Name That Lake for Nothing, Sunday Book Review, The New York Times, Oct. 31, 2008

In Depth interview with Fischer November 7, 2004

1935 births
Living people
Historians of the United States
Pulitzer Prize for History winners
Princeton University alumni
Johns Hopkins University alumni
Brandeis University faculty
20th-century American historians
American male non-fiction writers
21st-century American historians
Harold Vyvyan Harmsworth Professors of American History
20th-century American male writers